The Megas is a mini-series comic about a future society in an alternate reality.

The Megas may also refer to:

 The Megas (band), a video-game cover music band from California, U.S.
 Los Megas, a former Mexican professional wrestling group

See also
Megas (disambiguation)